David Sehat is an American academic. He is a professor of American intellectual and cultural history at Georgia State University. He was the 2017-18 John G. Winant Visiting Professor of American Government at the Rothermere American Institute and Balliol College, Oxford. He is the author of two books. He won the Organization of American Historians's 2012 Frederick Jackson Turner Award for The Myth of American Religious Freedom.

Works

References

Living people
Georgia State University faculty
21st-century American historians
21st-century American male writers
Year of birth missing (living people)
American male non-fiction writers